Flexomornis (meaning "flexed shoulder bird") is a genus of enantiornithean birds known from fossils found in Texas rocks belonging to the Woodbine Formation (Lewisville Member) dating to the middle Cenomanian age of the late Cretaceous period. It contains a single species, Flexomornis howei, named for the amateur fossil hunter Kris Howe, who discovered the site where the fossils were found.

References

Euenantiornitheans
Fossil taxa described in 2010